BHH or Bhh may refer to
United June Movement (BHH), Turkish political coalition
Bisha Domestic Airport, 'Asir Province, Saudi Arabia (IATA: BHH)
Berlin-Hohenschönhausen station, Germany (DS100 code: BHH)
Bhera railway station, Punjab, Pakistan (station code: BHH)
Bukhori dialect of Tajiki, spoken in Central Asia (ISO 639-3 code: bhh)

See also
BHHS (disambiguation)